The 2018 Asian Girls' U17 Volleyball Championship, referred to as the 2018 SMM Est Cola Asian Girls' U17 Volleyball Championship for sponsorship reasons, was the twelfth edition of the Asian Girls' U17 Volleyball Championship, a biennial international volleyball tournament organised by the Asian Volleyball Confederation (AVC) with Thailand Volleyball Association (TVA) for the girls' under-17 national teams of Asia. The tournament was held in Nakhon Pathom, Thailand, from 20 to 27 May 2018.

A total of thirteen teams played in the tournament, with players born on or after 1 January 2001 eligible to participate.

Same as previous editions, the tournament acted as the AVC qualifiers for the FIVB Volleyball Girls' U18 World Championship. The top four teams qualified for the 2019 FIVB Volleyball Girls' U18 World Championship as the AVC representatives.

Qualification
The thirteen AVC member associations (included the India volleyball team under the Indian Olympic Association, who was suspended by the FIVB, and was lifted the suspension in May 2018) will participate in the tournament with Thailand already qualified as host country the eight teams participated in the 2017 Asian Girls' U18 Volleyball Championship, and the three remaining teams did not participate in the previous edition. The thirteen AVC member associations were from four zonal associations, including, Central Asia (3 teams), East Asia (5 teams), Oceania (2 team) and Southeast Asia (2 teams). While any West Asian teams did not participate this edition.

Qualified teams
The following teams qualified for the tournament.

Pools composition
This is the first Asian Girls' U17 Volleyball Cup which will use the new competition format. Following the 2017 AVC Board of Administration’s unanimous decision, the new format will see teams being drawn into three or four pools up to the total amount of the participating teams. Each team as well as the host side will be assigned into a pool according to their previous ranking (2017 Asian Girls' U18 Volleyball Championship). As the three best-ranked teams will be drawn in the same Pool A, the next best three will contest Pool B, the next best three will contest Pool C. Pool D will comprise teams finishing next best four teams.

Venues
Nakhon Pathom Gymnasium in Mueang Nakhon Pathom, Nakhon Pathom

Squads
Players born on or after 1 January 2002 are eligible to compete in the tournament. Each team must register a squad of 12 players from 19 players of preliminary squad. (Regulations Articles 4.5, 4.6, 5.4 and 5.5).

Preliminary round
All times are Indochina Time (UTC+07:00)

Pool standing procedure
 Number of matches won
 Match points
 Sets ratio
 Points ratio
 Result of the last match between the tied teams

Match won 3–0 or 3–1: 3 match points for the winner, 0 match points for the loser
Match won 3–2: 2 match points for the winner, 1 match point for the loser
Match forfeited: 0 match points for each.

Pool A

|}

Pool B

|}

Pool C

|}

Pool D

|}

Bracket composition

Final round
All times are Indochina Time (UTC+07:00)

Classification round (R9–12)

Ninth to Twelfth places

|}

Eleventh place

|}

Ninth place

|}

Classification round (R5–8)

Fifth to Eighth places

|}

Seventh place

|}

Fifth place

|}

Championship round (R1–12)

Play-offs
Winners will advance to Quarter-finals.
Losers will transfer to Classification round (R9–12).

|}

Quarter-finals
Winners will advance to Semi-finals and World Championship.
Losers will transfer to Classification round (R5–8).

|}

Semi-finals
Winners will advance to Finals.
Losers will be given a chance to Third place play-off .

|}

Third place

|}

Final

|}

Final standing

Awards

Most Valuable Player
 Nishikawa Yoshino
Best Outside Spikers
 Nishikawa Yoshino
 Zhou Yetong
Best Setter
 Supatcha Kamtalaksa

Best Opposite Spiker
 Manami Koyama
Best Middle Blocker
 Wu Mengjie
 Madoka Kashimura
Best Libero
 Jidapa Nahuanong

See also
2018 Southeast Asian Girls' U17 Volleyball Championship

References

External links
 Asian Volleyball Confederation

2018
Asian U17 Championship
International volleyball competitions hosted by Thailand
2018 in Thai women's sport
May 2018 sports events in Asia